is a railway station in the city of Kariya, Aichi Prefecture,  Japan, operated by Meitetsu.

Lines

Station layout
The station has a single elevated island platform, with the station building located underneath. The station has automatic turnstiles for the Tranpass system of magnetic fare cards and is unattended.

Platforms

Adjacent stations

|-
!colspan=5|Nagoya Railroad

Station history
The Mikawa Railway Company was taken over by Meitetsu on June 1, 1941. The station was renamed to its present name on March 1, 1952. The tracks were elevated and the station building rebuilt in 1980.

Passenger statistics
In fiscal 2017, the station was used by an average of 6602 passengers daily.

Surrounding area
 Kariya Castle
 Kariya High School

See also
 List of Railway Stations in Japan

External links

 Official home page

Railway stations in Japan opened in 1914
Railway stations in Aichi Prefecture
Stations of Nagoya Railroad
Kariya, Aichi